The 1998 Intersport Grand Prix was a women's tennis tournament played on outdoor clay courts at the Am Rothenbaum in Hamburg in Germany and was part of Tier II of the 1998 WTA Tour. The tournament ran from April 27 through May 3, 1998. Martina Hingis won the singles title.

Finals

Singles

 Martina Hingis defeated  Jana Novotná 6–3, 7–5
 It was Hingis' 7th title of the year and the 32nd of her career.

Doubles

 Barbara Schett /  Patty Schnyder defeated  Martina Hingis /  Jana Novotná 7–6(7–3), 3–6, 6–3
 It was Schett's only title of the year and the 5th of her career. It was Schnyder's 3rd title of the year and the 3rd of her career.

External links
 ITF tournament edition details

Intersport Grand Prix
WTA Hamburg
1998 in German women's sport
1998 in German tennis